Faran Tangi is a village and union council of Ziarat District in the Balochistan province of Pakistan.

It lies 10 km from Ziarat, off the main road to Quetta. A small waterfall formed by the mountain spring flows down, it is 2 km walk from the main road to the waterfall and is ideal place for a picnic.

References

Populated places in Ziarat District
Union councils of Balochistan, Pakistan